Grishino is a rural locality (a village) in Pokrovskoye Rural Settlement, Velikoustyugsky District, Vologda Oblast, Russia. The population was 13 as of 2002.

Geography 
Grishino is located 25 km southeast of Veliky Ustyug (the district's administrative centre) by road. Utkino is the nearest rural locality.

References 

Rural localities in Velikoustyugsky District